The Peninsula Shield Force (or Peninsula Shield) is the military arm of the Gulf Cooperation Council (GCC). It is intended to deter, and respond to military aggression against any of the GCC member countries: Bahrain, Kuwait, Oman, Saudi Arabia, Qatar, and the United Arab Emirates.

Creation
In 1984, the Gulf Cooperation Council (GCC) decided to create a joint military force of 10,000 soldiers divided into two brigades, called the Peninsula Shield Force, based in Saudi Arabia near the Kuwaiti and Iraqi borders. The PSF is composed of infantry, armor, artillery, and combat support elements from each of the GCC countries. In 1992, the Peninsula Shield Force was headed by a Saudi Arabian, based near King Khalid Military City at Hafar al Batin, and had one infantry brigade of 5,000 men from all the GCC member states. As of late 2006, the Peninsula Shield Force had 7,000 personnel and functioned as a joint intervention force to defend the joint border of Saudi Arabia, Kuwait, and Iraq. In November 2006, the GCC Joint Defense Council considered a Saudi proposal to expand the capabilities of the Shield and to establish a joint command and control system.

In December 2007, Kuwait's National Security Council chief Shaikh Ahmed Fahad Al Ahmed Al Sabah announced that the GCC plans to create a replacement for the Peninsula Shield Force. He stated that "the GCC options would always be unified just as they were when leaders declared the establishment of a common market at the Doha Summit."

Leadership and structure
, the Peninsula Shield Force was commanded by Saudi Major General Mutlaq bin Salem Al-Azima and has about 40,000 troops and continues to have its permanent base at King Khalid Military City near Hafar al Batin.

According to Peninsula Shield Force commander Al-Azima, any intervention by the force must include participation from all GCC member states.

Use of the Peninsula Shield Force

1990–91

The Peninsula Shield Force was not sufficiently developed to be deployed in defence of Kuwait ahead of the invasion and occupation of Kuwait by Iraq in August 1990. A force of about 3,000 men from the Peninsula Shield Force, in addition to forces of its member states, took part in the liberation of Kuwait in March 1991.

2003
10,000 troops and two ships of Peninsula Shield Force were deployed to Kuwait in February 2003 ahead of the Iraq War to protect Kuwait from potential Iraqi attacks. It did not participate in operations against Iraq.

Role in Bahraini uprising
 

On 14 March 2011, the Bahraini government requested Peninsula Shield Forces enter Bahrain via the causeway from Saudi Arabia. Forces were from Saudi Arabia and the UAE entered Bahrain while Kuwait and Oman refrained from sending troops. The Bahraini uprising was the first GCC deployment in relation to an internal threat. In late March, Peninsula Shield Force commander al-Azima stated that the role of the force in Bahrain was to "secure Bahrain's vital and strategically important military infrastructure from any foreign interference" and to protect Bahraini borders while Bahrain security forces are "preoccupied with [Bahraini] internal security". He denied that the force caused any Bahraini citizen to "suffer so much as a scratch", and said that the force entered Bahrain "to bring goodness, peace, and love".

The 2011 Bahraini intervention, involved about 10% of the Peninsula Shield Force. Every military unit present in Bahrain included soldiers from all six GCC member states. While some have argued that this was a Saudi attempt to block democratic processes taking hold, Bahraini officials argued that the Peninsula Shield Force was there to protect government facilities, rather than to intrude in the internal affairs of the country itself. In October 2011 the Peninsula Shield announced its intention to sue "a number of satellite TV channels for propagating lies and allegations about the Peninsula Shield forces that entered Bahrain". This followed persistent claims by these channels about the Gulf forces strafing demonstrators with warplanes and destroying mosques.

Frequent Saudi Arabian street protests in and near Qatif in mid to late March, originally calling for political prisoners to be released, extended to opposition to the Peninsula Shield Force's presence in Bahrain.

American urging of closer defense ties
Chuck Hagel called for greater defense cooperation in the GCC, including bloc sales of American arms to the organization. 

On 11 December 2013, the GCC announced the formation of a joint military command.

In 2016, Saudi Arabia held a military drill named "North Thunder" with a consortium of 20 countries to display its military cooperation with Arab countries. Pakistan, Djibouti, and other nations also contributed to the drill.

See also
 Military of Bahrain
 Military of Kuwait
 Military of Oman
 Military of Qatar
 Military of Saudi Arabia
 Military of the United Arab Emirates

References

External links
 The Gulf Cooperation Council's Peninsular Shield Force at Defense Technical Information Center
 GCC to Discuss ‘Peninsula Shield’ Expansion, M. Ghazanfar Ali Khan, Gulf News, 2 November 2006

International organizations based in the Middle East
Gulf Cooperation Council
Organizations established in 1984
International military organizations
20th-century military alliances
21st-century military alliances
Bahraini uprising of 2011
Military alliances involving Saudi Arabia